The Hôtel de Gueydan (a.k.a. Hôtel de Gueidan) is a listed hôtel particulier in Aix-en-Provence, Bouches-du-Rhône, France.

Location
It is located at 22, Cours Mirabeau, in the centre of Aix-en-Provence.

History
In 1648, Martin Eyguesier, a lawyer, purchased the parcel of land and build this hotel particulier.

Several decades later, in 1681, it was purchased by Pierre de Gueidan, a wealthy lawyer. His son, Gaspard de Gueidan (de Valabre) (1688-1767) grew up in this hotel.

Heritage significance
It has been listed as a "monument historique" since August 9, 1941.

References

Hôtels particuliers in Aix-en-Provence
Monuments historiques of Aix-en-Provence